is an annual international cosplay event, which promotes global interaction through Japanese pop culture. It developed from a cosplay exhibition held at the Aichi Expo in 2005.

The WCS incorporated in 2012, by which time it had grown to include two weeks of activities, chief of which are a parade and championship held in Nagoya, Aichi, Japan, on Saturday and Sunday of the first weekend of August. Other related events are held in the Kanto, Kansai, and Tokai regions. Competitors are drawn from partnering anime/manga events held in the respective countries and regions.

The summit was organized by broadcaster TV Aichi until 2012. It is supported by several city organizations, businesses, the WCS student volunteer organization Omotenashi, and the Japanese Ministry of Foreign Affairs (MOFA), Ministry of Land, Infrastructure and Transport (MLIT), and Ministry of Economy, Trade and Industry (METI). Japanese embassy representatives often attend preliminaries of events in foreign countries. The WCS relies heavily on corporate sponsorship rather than ticket sales to fund its activities.

History
The first World Cosplay Summit was held in 2003 to highlight the international popularity of Japanese anime and manga through cosplay (costume play). It was subsequently held as part of Expo 2005 in Nagoya, where it gathered considerable media attention. The event grew to include participants from 40 countries and encompasses multiple activities including the Osu Cosplay Parade and the Cosplay Championship.

2003–2007

On October 12, 2003, the first event was held at the Rose Court Hotel in Nagoya. Activities included a panel discussion and photography session.

The 2004 event was held on August 1 at the Ōsu shopping district in Naka-ku, Nagoya. Eight international cosplayers were invited, and about 100 cosplayers participated in the inaugural Osu Cosplay Parade.

In 2005, the WCS was reorganized from an invitation-based system to a qualifying system with preliminary events held around the world, leading to the first WCS Cosplay Championship. Four cosplayers in single and group teams represented participating countries.  Along with supporting activities, the event took place in two main locations: the Cosplay Parade was held in Osu on July 31 and the Cosplay Championship was held at the Expo Dome on August 7 during Expo 2005. 40 people from seven countries participated in the first Cosplay Championship, with France winning the group category, Italy winning the individual category, and with the overall contest winner being Italy. The initial goal of the event was to bring a part of Japanese youth culture to Expo 2005.

In 2006, the venue for the Cosplay Championship was moved to Oasis 21 in Sakae, Nagoya. Nine countries competed: Italy, Germany, France, Spain, China, Brazil, Thailand, Singapore and Japan, with a total of 22 cosplayers. The grand prize was won by brother-and-sister team Maurisio and Monica Somenzari L. Olivas, representing Brazil. (Dressed respectively as Hughes de Watteau and Augusta Vradica from Trinity Blood, they made their costumes by hand with help from their parents.) The event was supported by Japan's Ministry of Foreign Affairs (MOFA) and Ministry of Land, Infrastructure and Transport (MLIT). Over 5,000 people attended the Cosplay Championship stage event and several thousand more attended the Cosplay Parade. TV Aichi produced and broadcast, "World Cosplay Summit 2006: New Challengers".

In 2007, Denmark, Mexico and South Korea joined the event to bring the number of participating countries to 12, with a total of 28 participating cosplayers. About 10,000 people attended the Cosplay Championship. "World Cosplay Summit 2007: Giza-suge yatsura ga yattekita Z!" (The Super Cool Have Arrived!) was televised, and became a part of MLIT's 2007 "Visit Japan" campaign.

2008–2012
In 2008, with growing recognition of Japan's otaku culture, the Ministry of Economy, Trade and Industry (METI) became the third national ministry to join in official support of the event. About 300 cosplayers participated in the Parade. Thirteen countries with a total of 28 representative cosplayers performed in the Championship in front of 12,000 visitors. TV Aichi produced and broadcast the WCS special "Everyone's Heroes Get Together!".It's a last time Japan had more national team representative than one team.

In April 2009, the WCS Executive Committee was created to administrate the development and expansion of the event. The parade had grown to 500 cosplayers, and 30 participants from 15 countries competed in the Cosplay Championship before 12,000 spectators, with Australia and Finland being the two newest participating nations. The first international symposium was held at Nagoya University entitled "Outward Minded: Worldwide Impact of Cosplay and Interpretations in Japan".

In 2010, the symposium was moved to the Mode Gakuen Spiral Towers.

In 2011, the Netherlands and Malaysia joined, bringing the total participating countries to 17. 

In 2012, the United Kingdom, Indonesia and Russia entered competitively at WCS, with Hong Kong and Taiwan participating under observer status, bringing the total number of represented countries to 22. WCS expanded to 12 days for its 10th anniversary, with official visits paid to Gifu, Mie, Tottori and Aichi Prefectural offices, and a second parade was held in Ichinomiya during the Tanabata Festival. The sequence of activities were altered, with the Championship held on the Saturday and the Parade on Sunday.

2013–2017
In 2013, Vietnam and the Philippines joined as observer nations, bringing the overall total to 24. The event was held with the help of local and international volunteers since 2009; however, this year saw the beginning of the Omotenashi (Hospitality) student volunteer group. This was the first year of the WCS as an independent company after 10 years where it was organized through the Events Department of TV Aichi. This was the first year of the World Cosplay Summit has become available broadcast live via Niconico.

In 2014, This was the first year that the Championship was held at the Aichi Arts Center beside Oasis 21. Portugal was selected to join. Also, Kuwait joined the WCS as the first nation from the Middle East, which brought the total number of participating nations/regions to 26.

In 2015, The Championship moved to the largest venue within the Aichi Arts Center called 'The Theater'. With the inclusion of Canada and Sweden as Observer Nations, the number of participating nations/regions now total 28

In 2016, India (the first nation from South Asia) and Switzerland joined the WCS, bringing the number of participating nations/region to 30. With this large field, the Championship was held in two stages over consecutive days. The First Stage, held on Saturday, will be divided into 2 groups and only 8 teams will be selected per group to qualify for the next round by an organized committee from each country who has no stake in their own country in each group and special prizes (Brother, Niconico etc.) will be distributed immediately after the selection.It was later found that the votes were miscounted, with Germany and South Korea having the same score as some of the nations with the fewest points to qualify. The jury has decided that both nations will advance to the next round for justice. which resulted in a total of 18 teams qualified for the next round.In The Second Stage held on Sunday All teams qualified in the afternoon before the start of the main event in the Championship round. They had to meet with the committee to explain the costumes.This was the first year of the World Cosplay Summit has become available used backscreen for enhance abilities representative's performance.

In 2017, Belgium, Chile, Myanmar, Puerto Rico, and United Arab Emirates joined, while Kuwait withdrew, bringing the number of participating nations/region to 34. This was the first year the WCS allowed the use of dialog and scenarios from Japanese live action adaptations for performances. During the final stage of the Championships, participants from Taiwan and Brazil made unexpected marriage proposals on the stage.

2018–2022

In 2018, Bulgaria, Costa Rica, and South Africa joined WCS.  Kuwait returned to participate while Puerto Rico and United Arab Emirates were unable to send representatives, bringing the number of participating nations/regions to 36. The Championship was held in a single stage at the Dolphins Arena Gymnasium. The Taiwanese cosplayers who became engaged during the 2017 championship held their wedding ceremony in the Wedding Hall Photo Party event;after the cake cutting ceremony, there was another surprise as the male WCS representative from Singapore made an unexpected marriage proposal. A night parade event was held for the first time at Central Park underground street.

In 2019, Austria, Israel, Saudi Arabia, and Trinidad and Tobago joined WCS. United Arab Emirates returned to participate after being absent in 2018 while Kuwait and Puerto Rico were unable to send representatives for this year, bringing the number of participating nations/regions to 40. The WCS Championship expanded to a three-stage event: the Tokyo Round at Tokyo Dome City Hall on 27 August, only the two teams with the most points in each group from the costume show will be qualified for the finals immediately and the remaining 32 teams will compete in the next round.It was originally announced that Group 3's Mexico and Costa Rica would advance to the Final, With the mistake of counting the votes and it was discovered later that Russia had more points than Costa Rica. So Russia has the right to compete in the final instead of Costa Rica.On 31 August, A bridal cosplay party was held in Wedding Hall Bleu Leman, where the male WCS Alumni 2018 from Chile made an unexpected marriage proposal during the event. The Nagoya Round (Semi) and Final (Championship) moved to the venue within the Aichi Arts Center. In the Nagoya Round, there will be a method of selection through the Stage Performance Contest. Only 16 teams can advance to the final and compete against the 8 previous teams who have previously qualified for the final, a total of 24 teams in the World Cosplay Championship.This was the first year of the WCS was broadcast live on YouTube, But Tokyo Round And Nagoya Round Only.

In 2020, the cosplay championship stage was cancelled due to the COVID-19 pandemic. In place of the event, a 24 hour live stream fund-raising event and a Kickstarter campaign was held to support the event in Japan and its partner organizations around the world. The campaign raised over 11,000,000 yen.

In 2021, Colombia, Latvia, and Ukraine joined WCS and Saudi Arabia participated as an observer. However, due to COVID-19 restrictions on gatherings and travel, a number of countries/regions were unable to send teams, including Colombia, Latvia, Austria, China, South Korea, Trinidad and Tobago, UAE, Portugal, Denmark, and Myanmar. This brought the number of participating nations to 30. WCS 2021 was planned to utilize a combination of recorded, online and in-person events. A large mosaic mural of the Oasis 21 complex depicting cosplay images of many of the campaign backers was hung at Chubu International Airport. The WCS Championship was broadcast live on multiple channels: officially on Facebook, Niconico, and YouTube and by recognized broadcasters in various languages on Bilibili, Discord, and Twitch.

In 2022 will the 20th anniversary of the WCS but COVID-19 pandemic are continues including 2022 Russian invasion of Ukraine, a number of countries/regions were unable to send teams.The WCS organizing committee stipulates that there will be competitions in two categories by WCS representatives are coming to japan with 11 nations for participate in Stage division (6 August) and 17 nations who cannot send representatives come to japan will send video for participate in Video Division (7 August). But at the same time, 11 nations who have participated in Stage division will also participate in this event too, a total of 28 nations.On August 1, the WCS Organizing Committee announced that Finland unable send representatives to the stage division but still participating in the video division. And Saudi Arabia's participation in only video divisions has been canceled,total of countries participating to only 27 nations.The WCS Championship broadcast live was addition a new on Twitter And Locipo (Video Division Only).The first year WCS have grand champion two categories by Stage Division,Video Division And for the first time that the same nation has been got runner-up 2nd from both categories.Later 3 - 4 September A WCS Exhibition Event will be hosted for the first time in outside of Japan in Riyadh,Saudi Arabia called "World Cosplay Summit Exhibition Gamers8!!".Bangladesh, Czech Republic, Egypt, Lebanon and Poland joined WCS.It is the first time that Colombia, Latvia has sent a joint representative after being unable to do so in 2021.the representatives are all alumni over the years, including the most recent representative and some representatives has been direct invite by WCS

Results

Yearly results for the top awards:

 Group Champion:  (Pauline Mesa, Laurence Guermond, Wendy Roeltgen)
 Individual Champion:  Giorgia Vecchini
 3rd:  (Alessandro Leuti, Alessia de Magistris)

Results of the most recent Championship
Results of the 2021-2022 World Cosplay Championship:

Performance by country

This list contains the champions of World Cosplay Summit.

See also
 Cosplay
 Anime convention
 List of anime conventions

References

External links

 Official World Cosplay Summit website

Anime conventions in Japan
Competitions in Japan
Recurring events established in 2003
Cosplay